Entoman is a fictional character created by David Füleki. He is an anthropomorphic duck with superhuman powers who has major or minor roles in many comic books.

Characteristics
According to his creator, Entoman is the incarnation of Siegmund Freud's id, which means that he does everything he wants without being bound by his conscience. Furthermore, Entoman often shows very crude forms of brutality but also high intelligence and even childish behavior. His only weakness may be his desire for ice cream.

Major Appearances
 78 Tage auf der Straße des Hasses a.k.a. Manga-Madness: 78 Tage auf der Straße des Hasses (since 2008, Delfinium Prints; 2012, Tokyopop)
 Super Epic Brawl Omega (since 2009, Shounen Go!Go!)
 Entomans Eiscreme-Party der tödlichen Sünden (2009, Delfinium Prints)
 Entomans fröhliche (aber leider auch tödliche) Weihnachten (2010, in e-Comix #3 by UndergroundComix)
 Blutrotkäppchen a.k.a. Manga-Madness: Blutrotkäppchen (2010, Comicstars; 2010, Delfinium Prints; 2012, Tokyopop)
 Entoman vs. Aprilwetter (2010, Comicstars; 2011, Delfinium Prints)
 Entoman: Serial Sausage Slaughter a.k.a. Manga-Madness: Serial Sausage Slaughter (2010, Comicstars; 2011, Tokyopop)

Awards
 ICOM Independent Comic Preis 2011: praising mention for the first Entoman book Blutrotkäppchen
 Sondermann 2011: category: best webcomic for Entoman: Serial Sausage Slaughter
 ICOM Independent Comic Preis 2012: outstanding artwork

External links
 Manga-Madness: the official homepage of Entoman-creator David Füleki

References

2008 comics debuts
Animal superheroes
Comics by David Füleki
Fictional anthropomorphic characters
Comedy characters
Fictional ducks
Humor comics
Comics characters introduced in 2008
Fictional German people
German comics characters